The governor of Queensland is the representative in the state of Queensland of the monarch of Australia. In an analogous way to the governor-general of Australia at the national level, the governor performs constitutional and ceremonial functions at the state level. In particular the governor has the power to appoint and dismiss the premier of Queensland and all other ministers in the cabinet, and issue writs for the election of the state parliament.

The current governor of Queensland, former Chief Health Officer of Queensland Jeannette Young, was sworn in on 1 November 2021.

The chief justice of the Supreme Court of Queensland, currently Helen Bowskill, acts in the position of governor in the governor’s absence. As from June 2014, Queen Elizabeth II, upon the recommendation of then-Premier Campbell Newman, accorded all current, future and living former governors the title 'The Honourable' in perpetuity.

Official residence
The governor of Queensland has resided at Government House, Brisbane since 1910. Unlike Fernberg, the original Government House was purpose-built and was used from 1862 to 1910; the building still exists today on the grounds of Queensland University of Technology.

Constitutional provisions

The office of governor is established by the Constitution of Queensland. Section 29 of the Constitution as passed in 2001 provides that the office of governor must exist and be appointed by the sovereign, but parts of the earlier Constitution Act of 1867 relating to the governor are still in force owing to the double entrenchment of them within the constitution by the government of Joh Bjelke-Petersen, who feared that the office and powers of state governor might be abolished following the controversies of the 1975 Australian constitutional crisis at a federal level.

In accordance with the conventions of the Westminster system of parliamentary government, the governor nearly always acts solely on the advice of the head of the elected government, the premier of Queensland. Nevertheless, the governor retains the reserve powers of the Crown, and has the right to appoint and dismiss ministers, issue pardons, and dissolve Parliament.

The Queensland constitution expressly provides that the governor "is not subject to direction by any person and is not limited as to the Governor's sources of advice" on the appointment or dismissal of ministers (s. 35), another provision inserted by the Bjelke-Petersen government in the wake of the 1975 federal dismissal. This provision worked against Bjelke-Petersen when, in the dying days of his government in November 1987, he tried and failed to convince Governor Sir Walter Campbell to remove several ministers to shore up his own support within Parliament. When the parliamentary wing of the National Party deposed Bjelke-Petersen and elected one of the dissident ministers, Mike Ahern, as the new leader of the National Party, Bjelke-Petersen initially refused to resign as premier and Sir Walter resisted calls to dismiss him. Bjelke-Petersen elected to resign on 1 December 1987.

The governor is head of the Executive Council, a Queensland equivalent to the Federal Executive Council. The Council is composed of ministers from the government of the day. The chief justice of Queensland and other judges in the Queensland judicial system are appointed by the governor acting on the advice of the Executive Council.

Governor's standard
The governor standard comprises a union jack with a white roundel in the center with the state badge of Queensland: a light blue Maltese cross, surmounted by a royal crown and surrounded by garland of laurel leaves.

The general design of standards for British governors was approved by Queen Victoria in 1869.  The design for governors of Queensland was created and flown as a personal standard since 1876, when the Maltese Cross was adopted as the colonial badge.

If the standard is flying at Government House, on a vehicle or at an event, this indicates that the governor is present.
 
Past and present standards of the governor

List of governors of Queensland
The first Australian- (and Queensland-) born governor of Queensland was Lieutenant-General Sir John Lavarack (appointed 1946). His successor, Sir Henry Abel Smith was British. All subsequent governors have been Australian-born, except for Leneen Forde, who was born in Canada but who emigrated to Australia at an early age.

Prior to the separation of Queensland in 1859, it was part of New South Wales under the governors of New South Wales.

List of administrators and lieutenant-governors of Queensland
Administrators and lieutenant-governors are deputy roles generally appointed to carry out the duties of the governor when the governor is unavailable, due to travel or illness. If one is not appointed, then the duties are carried out by the chief justice of Queensland (or the most senior judge available). The following are the administrators and lieutenant-governors of Queensland:

Notes

References

External links

 Official Website of the Governor of Queensland

Parliament of Queensland
Queensland
Queensland-related lists